Tribhuvan University Teaching Hospital is well known public hospital in Nepal.This was established in 1982. Initially it had 300 bed facility which is now increased and now it has 700 bed facility.
this hospital is the site of Under Tribhuvan University teaching and research activities for Institute of Medicine. This hospital provides highly specialised as well as general services to the patients coming from different parts of country.

Services

 General OPD (Out Patient Department)
 EHS (Extended Health Services)
 Emergency services
 In-patient service.

References

Hospitals in Nepal
1982 establishments in Nepal

Opening hours
24 hours